The 1966 Nevada gubernatorial election occurred on November 8, 1966. Incumbent Democrat Grant Sawyer, who was challenged in the Democratic primary by Charles E. Springer, ran unsuccessfully for re-election to a third term as Governor of Nevada. He was defeated by Republican nominee Paul Laxalt.

Results

References

1966
Nevada
Gubernatorial
November 1966 events in the United States